The Roman Catholic Diocese of Yokadouma is a suffragan Latin diocese in the Ecclesiastical province of the Metropolitan of Bertoua in Eastern Cameroon, yet depends on the missionary Roman Congregation for the Evangelization of Peoples.

Its cathedral episcopal see is Cathédrale Marie Reine de la Paix, dedicated to Our Lady Queen of Peace, in the city of Yokadouma.

History 
It was established on May 20, 1991 on territory split off from the Diocese of Bertoua.

Statistics 
As per 2014, it pastorally served 20,050 Catholics (13.6% of 147,054 total) on 30,467 km2 in 14 parishes with 21 priests (16 diocesan, 5 religious), 38 lay religious (6 brothers, 32 sisters) and 5 seminarians.

Episcopal ordinaries
(all Roman rite)

Suffragan Bishops of Yokadouma: 
 Eugeniusz Juretzko, Missionary Oblates of Mary Immaculate (O.M.I.) (born Poland) (May 20, 1991 - April 25, 2017)
 Paul Lontsié-Keuné (first native incumbent) (April 25, 2017 – November 27, 2021), no previous prelature

See also 
 List of Catholic dioceses in Cameroon
 Roman Catholicism in Cameroon

Sources and external links 
 GCatholic.org - data for all sections

Roman Catholic dioceses in Cameroon
Roman Catholic dioceses established in 1991
1991 establishments in Cameroon
Roman Catholic Ecclesiastical Province of Bertoua